Thomas Chamberlain may refer to:
Sir Thomas Chamberlain, 1st Baronet (died 1643), who supported the Royalist cause in the English Civil War
Sir Thomas Chamberlain, 2nd Baronet (c. 1635–1682), who received a renewal of the baronetcy from the Lord Protector Oliver Cromwell
 Thomas Chamberlain (soldier) (1841–1896), lieutenant colonel in the U.S. army during the American Civil War
Thomas Chrowder Chamberlin (1843–1928), U.S. geologist
Thomas Chamberlain (MP for Appleby) (fl. 1397), MP for Appleby
Thomas Chamberlain, a character in The Killer Angels

See also
Tom Chamberlain (disambiguation)
Thomas Chamberlayne (disambiguation)
Chamberlain (surname)